HC Everest Kohtla-Järve is an ice hockey team located in Kohtla-Järve, Estonia, and playing in the Coolbet Hokiliiga, the top tier of ice hockey in Estonia. They play home games at the Kohtla-Järve Ice Hall.

History
HC Everest were founded in 2011, and since 2013 have played, sporadically, in the Meistriliiga. Originally playing under the name of Everest Kohtla-Järve, the team changed their name to HC Everest Kohtla-Järve in 2020.

In 2020 HC Everest took part in the inaugural Baltic Hockey League, a competition made up of two teams from each of Estonia, Latvia and Lithuania. Narva PSK were originally slated to represent Estonia in the competition alongside Tartu Välk 494, however, Narva were unable to participate as a result of the COVID-19 pandemic, and subsequently HC Everest took their place. They finished last in their group, losing to Lithuanian side Hockey Punks Vilnius and HK Liepāja of Latvia, as a result they did not progress to the final group.

Roster 
Updated January 14, 2021.

References

External links
 
eestihoki.ee 

Ice hockey clubs established in 2011
Sport in Kohtla-Järve
Ice hockey teams in Estonia
Meistriliiga (ice hockey)
2011 establishments in Estonia